Lohan Evindra Ratwatte (born 22 June 1968) is a Sri Lankan politician. He is the State Minister of gem and jewelry and a Member of Parliament from the Kandy District. He is the eldest son of General Anuruddha Ratwatte, former cabinet minister and deputy defense minister.

Early life and education 
Born on 22 June 1968 in Kandy to Captain Anuruddha Ratwatte and Carman Ratwatte nee Rangala, he was the eldest with one younger brother, Mahendra Ratwatte. The Ratwattes were an old Radala family descending from the courtiers of the Kingdom of Kandy, with Ratwatte, Dissawa of Matale singing the Kandyan Convention. His grandfather Harris Leuke Ratwatte was a colonial era legislator. Lohan Ratwatte was educated at Trinity College, Kandy, where he played rugby and represented the Kandy Sports Club and Upcountry.

Political career 
Ratwatte was elected to the Central Provincial Council in 2009 and was elected to parliament in the 2010 Sri Lankan parliamentary election from Kandy representing the Sri Lanka Freedom Party (SLFP). In 2012, he was appointed SLFP chief organizer of Pathadumbara by President Mahinda Rajapaksa, succeeding his father General Anuruddha Ratwatta. He served as State Minister of Road Development. He was re-elected in the 2015 Sri Lankan parliamentary election and the 2020 Sri Lankan parliamentary election. In 2020, he was appointed State Minister of gem and jewelry related industries and in December 2020 he was given the additional appointed State Minister of Prison Management and Prisoners Rehabilitation.

Controversies 
Lohan Ratwatte was charged for the murder of ten supporters of the Sri Lanka Muslim Congress in Udathalawinna during the 2001 Sri Lankan parliamentary election when his father was deputy defense minister. He was acquitted of all charges by the High Court of Colombo in 2006. Five body guards of the Ratwatte family were convicted and sentenced to death.

In 2021 reports surfaced alleging that Ratwatte had threatened to kill two Tamil prisoners and local newspapers reported a government minister forcibly entering the Welikada Prison to with a group of friends including Pushpika De Silva to visit the gallows. He later tendered his resignation on 15 September 2021 where he acknowledged responsibility for both incidents. Both Ratwatte and De Silva denied having entered the Welikada prison and the Commissioner General of Prisons stated no incident was reported, while Rear Admiral Sarath Weerasekara, the Minister of Public Security stated that a licensed firearm was used.

See also
List of political families in Sri Lanka

References

External links
Hon. Lohan Ratwatte, M.P.

1968 births
Alumni of Trinity College, Kandy
Living people
Members of the 14th Parliament of Sri Lanka
Members of the 15th Parliament of Sri Lanka
Members of the 16th Parliament of Sri Lanka
Members of the Central Provincial Council
Provincial councillors of Sri Lanka
Lohan
Sinhalese politicians
Sri Lankan Buddhists
Sri Lanka Freedom Party politicians
Sri Lanka Podujana Peramuna politicians
United People's Freedom Alliance politicians